Liora Itzhak (Pezarkar) (born 27 September 1974) is an Israeli singer of Indian origin. She was born in Israel to parents who had made aliyah from Mumbai, India. During Indian Prime Minister Narendra Modi's 2017 visit to Israel, she sang Hatikvah and Jana Gana Mana – the national anthem of Israel and India respectively.

Early life 
Born in Lod to Indian Jewish (Bene-Israeli) parents from the state of Gujarat , Itzhak moved to India at the age of 16, returning to Israel eight years later. In India, she attended the Sur Sarvadhan Institute in Pune, where she learned music from Pandit Suresh Talwalkar and his wife, as well as from Ramesh Nadkarni.

Career 
Itzhak cites Bappi Lahiri as one of her influences, who gave her a chance at a music career. While living in India, she sang with several famous singers, such as Kumar Sanu and Udit Narayan. She performed in the Bollywood film Dil ka Doctor.

In Israel, she collaborated with Israeli singer Yoav Itzhak. In 2015, she performed at a state banquet in honor of Indian President Pranab Mukherjee's visit to Israel. In 2017, she performed at the annual Israel Festival in Jerusalem. Her first album, Mala Mala, was popular in Israel and India.

Personal life
She is married and has 2 children.

External links 
 Official YouTube channel

References 

21st-century Israeli women singers
1974 births
Living people
People from Lod
Israeli Mizrahi Jews
Israeli people of Indian-Jewish descent
Hindi-language singers
Bene Israel